The Division of Canobolas was an Australian electoral division in the state of New South Wales. The division was proclaimed in 1900, and was one of the original 65 divisions to be contested at the first federal election. It was abolished in 1906, when the Division of Calare was created. It was named after Mount Canobolas (an Aboriginal word meaning "two peaks"). It was located in central western New South Wales, including the towns of Forbes, Orange and Parkes. It was held by the Australian Labor Party throughout its existence.

Members

Election results

1901 establishments in Australia
Constituencies established in 1901
Canobolas